Dante Marsh (born February 26, 1979) is a former Canadian football cornerback  who spent 11 seasons with the BC Lions of the Canadian Football League (CFL). Marsh attended college at Fresno State. He is currently the Cornerbacks Coach at Contra Costa College (San Pablo).

Professional career

Marsh had a brief stint with the NFL's Tennessee Titans in 2001, but missed the whole season due to injury. The BC Lions signed him as a free agent in 2004, in which Marsh recorded his career-high 61 tackles. In 2005, he started all 18 games, and had 47 defensive tackles and 7 special teams tackles. In 2006, Marsh had a career-high 4 interceptions as well as 52 tackles. He helped BC win the 2006 Grey Cup. Marsh is regarded as one of the best cornerbacks in the CFL and he was named a CFL All-Star in 2008. Entering his 10th season as a BC Lion, at age 34, he was awarded a contract extension. Marsh has 33 career interceptions and 3 defensive touchdowns.  He became a free agent in late 2014.

References

External links
BC Lions bio
DanteMash.com Official Website
 

1979 births
American players of Canadian football
BC Lions players
Canadian football defensive backs
Fresno State Bulldogs football players
Living people
Players of American football from Oakland, California
Players of Canadian football from Oakland, California
Tennessee Titans players
Kansas City Chiefs players
American football cornerbacks